Katrin Kliehm (born 17 May 1981) is a German football defender. She currently plays for 1. FFC Frankfurt, and has been capped 5 times for the German national team.

References

1981 births
Living people
German women's footballers
Germany women's international footballers
1. FFC Frankfurt players
German footballers needing infoboxes
Women's association football defenders
Place of birth missing (living people)